The Mercedes-AMG C-Coupé DTM is a silhouette racing car designed by Mercedes-Benz for the Deutsche Tourenwagen Masters championship. Mercedes-Benz chose the IAA International Motor Show in Frankfurt to present the new 2012 DTM AMG Mercedes C-Coupé. It is the successor to the AMG-Mercedes C-Klasse race car which was permanently retired after the 2011 season. Since 2015 the car has been renamed Mercedes-AMG C63 DTM. The C-Coupé DTM was initially based on the C204 Mercedes-Benz C-Coupé; for the 2016 season it was updated to reflect the new C205 Mercedes-Benz C-Coupé body style.

History
HWA AG began development, design and construction of the DTM AMG Mercedes C-Coupé in June 2010. The first chassis was assembled in June 2011, with the first vehicle completed in August. At the end of the 2018 season, Mercedes-Benz left the DTM after 19 years as they will be switching to Formula E from the 2019–20 season; this will be the last Mercedes vehicle in the DTM to date.

Characteristics
The DTM AMG-Mercedes C-Coupé was designed to meet the new and improved safety concept for 2012, which includes a state-of-the-art carbon fibre monocoque and a roll cage made of high strength steel. In order to improve driver protection in the event of an accident, all safety-related components such as the fire extinguishing system and fuel tank have been incorporated into the monocoque. Furthermore, each vehicle is equipped with six crash structures to give the driver additional protection to the front, rear and sides. These carbon fibre crash structures are designed to gradually absorb impact energy, so that the driver is not exposed to high deceleration forces.

The new safety concept was developed jointly by rights holder and promoter ITR e.V., the DMSB and the three manufacturers – Audi, BMW and Mercedes-Benz. In order to verify the performance of the DTM safety concept, the DMSB developed a test programme, which was carried out and analyzed by DEKRA, the independent testing organization. All tests were completed without any problems.

The new DTM AMG-Mercedes C-Coupé is based on the latest Mercedes-Benz C-Class Coupé, which celebrated its world premiere in autumn 2011.

Chassis
The Mercedes-Benz C-Coupé DTM was built to supersede the Mercedes-Benz C-Class race car, a chassis was made directly connected to the carbon fibre monocoque is a roll cage of high-strength steel; CFRP crash elements on the side, front and rear.

Weight
At the beginning of the 2012 season, homologation rules for DTM cars were changed, an increase in minimum weight from 1,050 kg to 1,110 kg was mandated.

Engines
The Mercedes-AMG C-Coupé DTM car was powered by a Mercedes-Benz AMG naturally-aspirated DOHC engine that carried over from previous Mercedes-Benz AMG W204 C-Class DTM, W203 C-Class DTM and CLK DTM cars. The engine was a 4.0-litre 90 degree V8 with four valves per cylinder, indirect fuel injection, air restricted to 2 x 28 mm by regulations.

Achievements
As of August 2017, Mercedes-AMG C63 Class Coupé DTM scored 19 victories, 17 poles, 20 fastest laps and 2 driver titles.

References

External links
Mercedes-Benz C-Coupé DTM Car Specifications

DTM
Deutsche Tourenwagen Masters cars